Edmund Fantino (June 30, 1939 – September 22, 2015) was an American  experimental psychologist.

He was raised in Queens, New York before continuing on to earn his bachelor's degree in Mathematics from Cornell University in 1961, and his Ph.D. in Experimental Psychology from Harvard University in 1964. His doctoral adviser was Dick Herrnstein.

Fantino was a professor at University of California, San Diego and was now a Distinguished Professor of Psychology and the Neurosciences Group. Some of his honors include being the former president of the Association for Behavior Analysis International, former editor of the Journal of the Experimental Analysis of Behavior, fellow of the Association for Behavior Analysis International, Distinguished Service to Behavior Analysis by the Society for the Advancement of Behavior Analysis, and several distinguished teaching awards from UCSD.

He published numerous articles spanning many topics including the quantitative analysis of behavior, learning and motivation, self-control, choice behavior, among others. He is perhaps most noticeably known for his Delay Reduction Theory that he first published in JEAB in 1969.

References

External links 
University of California - San Diego, Faculty

1939 births
2015 deaths
People from Queens, New York
American neuroscientists
20th-century American psychologists
Harvard Graduate School of Arts and Sciences alumni
University of California, San Diego faculty
Cornell University alumni